The 117th Division was a military formation of the People's Volunteer Army (Chinese People's Volunteers (CPV) or Chinese Communist Forces (CCF)) during the Korean War with a standard strength of approximately 10,000 men. It was a component of the 39th Army, consisting of the 349th, 350th, and 351st Regiments.

The division participated in the Battle of Unsan during the Korean War in the 1950s.

References 

Units and formations of the People's Armed Police